Pyatt is a surname. Notable people with the surname include:

Brad Pyatt, American football player
Chris Pyatt, British boxer
David Pyatt, British musical prodigy
Geoffrey R. Pyatt, diplomat
Nelson Pyatt, ice hockey player
Taylor Pyatt, ice hockey player
Tom Pyatt, ice hockey player